The Jefferson Mosier House is a historic house in Mosier, Oregon, United States. Jefferson N. Mosier (1860–1928) first platted the town in 1902 on what had been his father's donation land claim, and tirelessly promoted it for decades after. He built this prominent house in 1904, and remained in residence until his death. It is the only Queen Anne building in Mosier, and features many signature characteristics of the type.

The house was added to the National Register of Historic Places in 1990. By 2006, it had been converted for use as a bed and breakfast inn.

See also
National Register of Historic Places listings in Wasco County, Oregon

References

External links

Houses completed in 1904
1904 establishments in Oregon
Houses in Wasco County, Oregon
National Register of Historic Places in Wasco County, Oregon
Houses on the National Register of Historic Places in Oregon
Queen Anne architecture in Oregon
Bed and breakfasts in Oregon